Michael Johns (born Michael John Lee; 20 October 1978 – 1 August 2014) was an Australian singer who finished in eighth place on the seventh season of American Idol, in 2008. In 2009, he released a music album, Hold Back My Heart, which sold 20,000 copies. Johns died on August 1, 2014, at the age of 35 of dilated cardiomyopathy.

Early life
John Lee was born in Perth, Western Australia on 20 October 1978. As a teenager, he appeared as The Coachman in Pinocchio at the Regal Theatre and was a choir singer in Anything Goes at His Majesty's Theatre. He attended Newman College in Perth. In 1997, John Lee moved to the United States on a tennis scholarship and majored in drama at Abraham Baldwin Agricultural College in Tifton, Georgia, before dropping out after two quarters. He also briefly played Australian rules football for the United States Australian Football League (USAFL) club Atlanta Kookaburras from 2001 to 2002.

Career

Early career 
John Lee moved from Tifton to Atlanta to pursue a music career, playing cover engagements.  He then joined a band called Film for 18 months. After traveling to Los Angeles to showcase for a number of labels, he was signed to Maverick Records in 2002 as a solo artist under his birth name Michael Lee.  He recorded an album, and then formed a rock band called The Rising. A song from the album "Cradle" received some airplay, and the album titled Future Unknown was released in 2003. It was also released on iTunes in 2008 after he appeared on American Idol. After Maverick, he was signed to Columbia, but was later dropped. He started using the name Michael Johns in 2006 as an homage to his stepfather whose name, like his middle name, is John, hence "Johns" because there are two of them in the family.

American Idol

Overview 
He auditioned for the seventh season of American Idol at San Diego's Qualcomm Stadium in July 2007. He finished in eighth place in the competition.

Performances

Post-Idol
As one of the seventh season finalists, Johns joined the 2008 American Idol Live! tour after the show.  While he was on the Idol tour, he worked on a soundtrack for Olympic snowboarder Shaun White's documentary DVD Don't Look Down.  The soundtrack was released by Three Rings Projects on 20 January 2009. Johns sang on all but one of the vocal tracks.  In December 2008, he released a song he wrote in 2006, "Another Christmas."  Half the proceeds from the song were advertised as being donated to the Red Cross and half to fight amyotrophic lateral sclerosis.

In April 2009, he released "Heart on My Sleeve," the lead single from Hold Back My Heart.  The song debuted on Billboard's Adult Contemporary chart at number 27. The album was released on 23 June 2009, and debuted at number 97 on the Billboard 200 with 5,000 copies sold. It sold 20,000 copies as of January 2010.  In 2012, he released Love and Sex, a three-song EP.  He also appeared briefly in a 2012 episode of The Real Housewives of Beverly Hills.

Personal life
Lee married Stacey Vuduris, in 2007.

Death
Michael John Lee, died in Tustin, California on August 1, 2014. On November 18, 2014, the coroner reported that Johns had died of dilated cardiomyopathy, which inhibited the flow of blood to his body and also caused his heart to enlarge. A fatty liver also contributed to his death.

Johns was the first American Idol finalist to die after he appeared on the show.

Discography

Albums

Downtown Records

Singles

References

External links
 

1978 births
2014 deaths
American Idol participants
Australian expatriates in the United States
Musicians from Perth, Western Australia
21st-century Australian singers
20th-century Australian musicians
20th-century American musicians
Deaths from hepatic steatosis
Deaths from cardiomyopathy
20th-century American male musicians
21st-century Australian male singers